Akhullu or Hartashen is a village in the Khojavend District of Azerbaijan, in the disputed region of Nagorno-Karabakh. The village had an Azerbaijani-majority population prior to their expulsion during the First Nagorno-Karabakh War.

History 
During the Soviet period, the village was part of the Hadrut District of the Nagorno-Karabakh Autonomous Oblast. Before the Nagorno-Karabakh conflict, the village was inhabited by about 600 Azerbaijanis. On 8 January 1992, the Azerbaijani inhabitants of the village were forced to leave Akhullu due to shelling by the Armenian forces. During the First Nagorno-Karabakh War, the village came under the control of Armenian forces, on 2 October 1992. After the First Nagorno-Karabakh War, the village was administrated as part of the Hadrut Province of the breakaway Republic of Artsakh. The village came under the control of Azerbaijan during the 2020 Nagorno-Karabakh war.

Historical heritage sites 
Historical heritage sites in and around the village include a cemetery from between the 17th and 19th centuries.

Demographics 
The village had about 600 inhabitants, mostly Azerbaijani, during the Soviet period. After the First Nagorno-Karabakh war, the Azerbaijani inhabitants of the village were forced to leave the village. 101 inhabitants in 2005, and 91 inhabitants in 2015.

References

External links 
 

Populated places in Khojavend District
Nagorno-Karabakh
Former Armenian inhabited settlements